William Robert Parry (28 June 1890 – 9 July 1955) was a test match umpire.  Born in Bangor in 1890 he began umpiring Minor County matches in the 1920s after losing a leg in the Great War. Known for his idiosyncratic stance, as a result of his disability, he stood in 5 Test matches between 1928 and 1930 before withdrawing from the first class list in 1935 to pursue business interests. He was injured in a match between Yorkshire and Gloucestershire in 1927 when he fell as he hurried into position to judge a run out and broke the remains of his amputated limb. He died in Taunton in 1955.

References

1890 births
1955 deaths
English Test cricket umpires
British military personnel of World War I
English amputees